By Hook or by Crook is a 2001 buddy drama film written, directed by, and starring Harry Dodge and Silas Howard. The story follows two unlikely friends as they commit petty crimes and figure out their places in the world.

The film premiered at the 2001 Frameline Film Festival and went on to screen at the 2002 Sundance Film Festival. It won multiple awards on the film festival circuit, including the Audience Award for Best Narrative Feature at the 2002 SXSW Film Festival.

Plot
Shy, a transgender man, leaves his small town in Kansas for San Francisco after the death of his father. Along the way, he encounters Valentine, a quirky adoptee in search of his birth mother. An immediate kinship is sparked between the two men and they become partners in crime with Val’s lover Billie to stay financially afloat. The duo faces money troubles, emotional problems, and physical confrontations as they learn to trust and support each other in pursuit of their goals.

Cast 
Silas Howard as Shy
Harry Dodge as Valentine (as Harriet Dodge)
Stanya Kahn as Billie
Carina Gia as Isabelle
James Cotner as Attacker
Joan Jett as News interviewee
Kris Kovic as Crazy nut in park
Maia Lorian as Parisol girl 
Tina Marie Murray as Ms. Red
Aldo Pisano as Driver
Nancy Stone as Waitress

Production
The film is the directorial debut of both Howard and Dodge and was shot on mini DV.

Carla Bozulich of the Geraldine Fibbers wrote the score for the film. The soundtrack also features a song that Carla Bozulich co-wrote with the Geraldine Fibbers, "Lilybelle",  that was later covered by Kiki and Herb.

Release
The film had its world premiere at the Frameline Film Festival in San Francisco on June 17, 2001. In addition, it screened at the 2002 Sundance Film Festival. It was given a limited theatrical release on October 25, 2002.

Reception
On review aggregator Rotten Tomatoes, By Hook or by Crook has an approval rating of 64% based on 14 reviews.

Dave Kehr of The New York Times wrote the film "is, like its principal characters, a bit messy and maladroit but not without a certain charm", and "the humanity of the characters shines through, giving face and form to a subculture the movies have largely neglected".
TV Guide described the film as "An appealing, if decidedly unconventional, buddy picture that seems to channel Midnight Cowboy (1969) while going its own quirky way."

Awards
2001 LA Outfest: Audience Award: Outstanding Narrative Feature, Harriet Dodge and Grand Jury Award: Outstanding Screenwriting, Silace Howard and Harriet Dodge
2001 Seattle Lesbian & Gay Film Festival, Award for Excellence: Best Female Director, Silace Howard and Harriet Dodge, and Award for Excellence: Best Narrative Feature, Silace Howard and Harriet Dodge
2002 Paris Lesbian Film Festival, Winner of Audience Award: Best Film, Silas Howard and Harriet Dodge
2002 Philadelphia International Gay & Lesbian Film Festival Jury Prize: Best Feature - Lesbian, Silace Howard and Harriet Dodge
2002 SXSW Film Festival: Audience Award: Narrative Feature, Silace Howard and Harriet Dodge

References

External links
 Official website
 
 
 
 

2001 films
2001 crime drama films
2001 LGBT-related films
2001 romantic drama films
2001 independent films
American buddy drama films
American crime drama films
American drama road movies
American LGBT-related films
American romantic drama films
LGBT-related buddy drama films
Transgender-related films
Films about adoption
Films about hitchhiking
Films about trans men
Films about violence against LGBT people
2000s drama road movies
2000s English-language films
2000s American films